Deuterocopus devosi is a moth of the family Pterophoridae. It is known from New Guinea.

The wingspan is about 10 mm. Adults are on wing in March and November.

Etymology
The species is named after one of its collectors and a very active microlepidopterist, Mr R. de Vos.

References

External links
Papua Insects

Deuterocopinae